Match is a fictional character in the DC Comics Universe. He is a clone of Superboy. Match appeared in the Superboy title, issues of Young Justice and the Sins of Youth and Joker's Last Laugh crossover events. Currently, he is a member of the Suicide Squad.

Fictional character biography

The Agenda

Created using Superboy's DNA, Match was made to serve "the Agenda" a secret organization specializing in creating clone armies. Agent Amanda Spence was able to kidnap Superboy and the Agenda used his DNA to create the clone Match. Match was given implanted memories, like Superboy, but they included a greater host of information that Superboy did not have. He also had improved durability as well as greater control over his powers. In fact, it is believed by some that the host of data he was given helped him hone his powers.

In the resulting battle between the two clones, Superboy managed to come out on top and the reactor holding the Agenda's compound together exploded, destroying the base. Match was left alone and ailing.

Some time later, the Agenda kidnapped Superboy again and took over Project Cadmus. When the Agenda kidnapped Superboy, Match took his place in Young Justice. At this time, Project Cadmus was also infiltrated by several clones loyal to the Agenda. Eventually, Superboy freed himself and joined the fight against Match and the Agenda to free Cadmus.

During Joker's Last Laugh, after being poisoned with Joker venom, Match returned to infiltrate and terrorize Young Justice disguised to look like Superboy. While Superboy was away, Match was at Young Justice headquarters with Empress, Secret, Arrowette, and Wonder Girl in the hopes of killing them in a comical manner. While the Jokerized Match was unable to keep his plans secret from the girls, they simply believed he was Superboy pretending to be a Jokerized Match to try to lighten the mood after Robin and Impulse both quit earlier that day. Match left however after accidentally making Wonder Girl confess her love for Superboy, causing Match to develop feelings for her as well.

Titans East

The criminal mercenary Deathstroke begun forming Titans East, a team created explicitly to take down the Teen Titans. Though he was a powerful physical asset to the team, Match's presence was more of a psychological ploy, due to Superboy's death during the Infinite Crisis event. Deathstroke counted on Match's resemblance to Superboy, enhanced by changing his costume to match Superboy's last costume, to unbalance Robin, Superboy's best friend and the Titans' leader, and Wonder Girl, Superboy's girlfriend and one of the Titans' most powerful members.

Match's first appearance in Teen Titans #43 shows that both his mind and body have begun to rot away, making him behave more like a normal Bizarro clone, even going so far as to speak in contradictions. He appears to still have feelings for Wonder Girl, as he claims "I hate Wonder Girl". Following that, in Teen Titans #44, Wonder Girl wakes up in what seems to be a replica of the Fortress of Solitude in Slade's Titans Tower in New York. She sees what appears to be Superboy on a throne, but it is, in fact, Match, who claims "You so ugly when you sleep, me hate to watch you", continuing to speak in opposite logic as his body and mind deteriorate.

As he attempts to force his feelings on Wonder Girl, Match is unexpectedly attacked by Robin and Batgirl (who was freed from Slade's influence). His body appears less invulnerable than before, as Robin's throwing R's managed to cut into the clone's back. Wonder Girl, still furious at Match's very existence began an all out assault against the clone, only to still end up defeated along with her other teammates by Match and the other Titans East. When Nightwing, Donna Troy, Flash (Bart Allen) and Beast Boy arrive with Cyborg, Raven and Duela Dent, the unified Titans battle against the Titans East one last time. Match is defeated when Wonder Girl reflects his heat-vision back at him with her bracelets after which Jericho possesses his unconscious body.

But due to Match's Kryptonian powers, he was proven too dangerous to turn over to conventional authorities. As such, Jericho continued to control Match's body, which proved difficult for him after a point. At one point Match managed to break free of Jericho's control and began destroying Titans Tower. Wonder Girl however manages to soothe him long enough for him to become submissive to Jericho's control again.

Later Jericho, still trapped in Match's body, seemingly escapes from S.T.A.R. Labs in visible distress and asking for his friends' help. The Titans attempt to separate the two, only for Match to break free, with Jericho screaming in panic that he can not control him. When the two are finally separated, however, it is revealed that it was Match who was panicked, and that Jericho, whose mind had been corrupted by the time spent trapped inside Match, was in control of their shared body.

Match is later tracked down and killed by Superboy-Prime, who then turns his body over to the rogue scientist Doctor Calligan. Calligan dissects Match's body and uses it to reverse engineer three clones of Superboy that resemble the hero when he first appeared, during his time with Young Justice, and during the brief period when he was brainwashed by Lex Luthor, respectively. During the ensuing battle, Robin and Ravager destroy all three clones by using a Kryptonite blade.

Infinite Frontier
Following the events of Dark Nights: Death Metal, Match returned to mainstream continuity as a member of the Suicide Squad. Believing that he was the real Superboy, he eventually encountered Kon-El and fought with him. Afterwards, Match's squad mate Nocturna would show them Agenda's underground lab showing dozens of Superboy clones.

Appearance
Originally, Match's physical appearance was practically identical to Superboy's, except for white hair and pale eyes (in comparison to Superboy's black hair and blue eyes) and a "brand" of the Agenda's logo on the left side of his chest. This logo was also on his original costume, two intertwined double helixes (most likely to represent DNA) that form a shape akin to three circles. Match's look is currently very similar to a Bizarro clone of Superboy. Like Superboy after his redesign, Match has jeans and black T-shirt. However, the shirt has several tears or holes and the "S" shield is reversed, like Bizarro's. His body exhibits extreme skin calcification, a trait he shares with Bizarro. Due to genetic damage which accumulated over time, his mental and speech patterns currently resemble those of a Bizarro.

Powers and abilities
Match have superpowers similar to Superboy, but supposedly greater control. They include personal telekinesis, which can mimic Kryptonian powers and could be used to disassemble machinery. Like how Superboy eventually began to develop real capabilities from exposure to Earth's yellow sun when Match has already exhibited them himself. He can also vibrate his vocal cords to speak at different frequencies, while secretly communicating with the speedster, Bolt. 

It appears that Match's clone physiology is slowly rotting away over time, leaving the full extent of his current abilities questionable. His body became either less shielded or invulnerable, as Robin and Batgirl managed to cause him pain by striking Match with Robin's throwing R's.

Other versions
A child version of Match appears in Tiny Titans #25, along with Superboy. It is revealed that he has "magic words", which causes him to attack to get the object which has been mentioned. This includes "puppy" (causing him to chase Krypto) and "bubblegum" causing him to jump on Speedy and take a stick of the said gum from him.

In other media
 Match appears in the Young Justice episode "Agendas", voiced by Nolan North. This version is a clone of Superman created to fight him by Lex Luthor and Cadmus Labs from a sample of pure Kryptonian DNA, granting Match the full range of Kryptonian powers, who has been conditioned to respond violently to the sight of the Superman logo as part of "Project Match". However, due to the difficulties involved in replicating Kryptonian DNA, Match became mentally unstable, was placed in cryogenic storage, and replaced by Superboy.
 Match appears in issue #22 of the Young Justice tie-in comic. As of 2015, he has become severely deformed and paler. He fights Batgirl until she defeats him, after which he is taken away by a LexCorp van. After a long absence, Match subsequently returns in the fourth issue of the Young Justice: Targets comic miniseries as a member of Onslaught and fighting the Outsiders in Greater Bialya.

References

Characters created by Ron Marz 
Clone characters in comics
Comics characters introduced in 1997
DC Comics supervillains
DC Comics male supervillains
DC Comics characters who can move at superhuman speeds
DC Comics characters with superhuman senses
DC Comics characters with superhuman strength
DC Comics extraterrestrial supervillains
DC Comics hybrids
DC Comics metahumans
DC Comics telekinetics
Fictional characters who can manipulate sound
Fictional characters with air or wind abilities
Fictional characters with fire or heat abilities
Fictional characters with superhuman durability or invulnerability
Fictional characters with X-ray vision
Fictional characters without a name
Fictional genetically engineered characters
Fictional extraterrestrial–human hybrids in comics
Kryptonians
Superboy
Superman characters